In the mathematics of graph drawing, the crossing number inequality or crossing lemma gives a lower bound on the minimum number of edge crossings in a plane drawing of a given graph, as a function of the number of edges and vertices of the graph.

It has applications in VLSI design and combinatorial geometry,
and was discovered independently by Ajtai, Chvátal, Newborn, and Szemerédi
and by Leighton.

Statement and history
The crossing number inequality states that, for an undirected simple graph  with  vertices and  edges such that , the crossing number  obeys the inequality 

The constant  is the best known to date, and is due to Ackerman.

It is important to distinguish between the crossing number  and the pairwise crossing number . (This distinction is necessary since some authors assume that in a proper drawing no two edges cross more than once.)

Applications
The motivation of Leighton in studying crossing numbers was for applications to VLSI design in theoretical computer science.

Later,  realized that this inequality yielded very simple proofs of some important theorems in incidence geometry. For instance, the Szemerédi–Trotter theorem, an upper bound on the number of incidences that are possible between given numbers of points and lines in the plane,
follows by constructing a graph whose vertices are the points and whose edges are the segments of lines between incident points. If there were more incidences than the Szemerédi–Trotter bound, this graph would necessarily have more crossings than the total number of pairs of lines, an impossibility.
The inequality can also be used to prove Beck's theorem, that if a finite point set does not have a linear number of collinear points, then it determines a quadratic number of distinct lines.
Similarly, Tamal Dey used it to prove upper bounds on geometric k-sets.

Proof
We first give a preliminary estimate: for any graph  with  vertices and  edges, we have

 

Thus we can find a graph with at least  edges and  vertices with no crossings, and is thus a planar graph. But from Euler's formula we must then have , and the claim follows. (In fact we have  for ).

To obtain the actual crossing number inequality, we now use a probabilistic argument. By the preliminary crossing number inequality, we have

Taking expectations we obtain

We may assume that any two edges in this diagram with a common vertex are disjoint, otherwise we could interchange the intersecting parts of the two edges and reduce the crossing number by one. Therefore,  and we have

 

Now if we set  (since we assumed that ), we obtain after some algebra

 

Variations

References

Topological graph theory
Inequalities
Articles containing proofs
Graph drawing